Moises Aron Kupferstich (14 November 1905 – 18 May 1984) was a Poland-born Danish chess player and Danish Chess Championship medalist (1953, 1954).

Biography
From the late 1940s to the late 1950s, Moises Aron Kupferstich was one of the leading Danish chess players. He won two bronze medals in Danish Chess Championships (1953, 1954).

Moises Aron Kupferstich played for Denmark in the Chess Olympiad:
 In 1950, at fourth board in the 9th Chess Olympiad in Dubrovnik (+3, =5, -4).

References

External links

Moises Aron Kupferstich chess games at 365chess.com

1905 births
1984 deaths
Sportspeople from Lublin
Danish chess players
Chess Olympiad competitors
20th-century chess players